Tokay may refer to:

Viniculture
 Tokaji (formerly spelled Tokay in English), wines produced in the Tokaj region of Hungary and Slovakia
 Muscadelle, called Tokay in Australia
 Tocai Friulano, a defunct  synonym for Sauvignon vert in the Friuli-Venezia Giulia wine region in Italy
 Tokay d'Alsace, an obsolete name for Pinot gris grapes in Alsace
 Tokay (grape), an alternative name for the Hungarian wine grape Furmint
 Viura, a Spanish wine grape with Tokay as a synonym
 Catawba (grape), an American grape with Tokay as a synonym

Other uses
 Tokay gecko, a gecko native to southeast Asia and the Indo-Australian Archipelago
 Tokay High School, a high school in Lodi, California
 Tokay Mammadov (1927–2018), Azerbaijani sculptor-monumentalist
 "Tokay", a song from the 1929 operetta Bitter Sweet
 The former name of Malaga, California

See also
Tokai (disambiguation), which covers Tōkai and Tokai
Tokaj (disambiguation)